Salima Yenbou (born 14 March 1971) is a French school administrator and politician who was elected as a Member of the European Parliament in 2019.

Political career
In parliament, Yenbou has since been serving on the Committee on Foreign Affairs and on the Committee on Culture and Education. In 2022, she joined the Committee of Inquiry to investigate the use of Pegasus and equivalent surveillance spyware.  

In addition to her committee assignments, Yenbou is part of the Parliament's delegation to the Parliamentary Assembly of the Union for the Mediterranean. She is also a member of the European Parliament Intergroup on Anti-Racism and Diversity, the European Parliament Intergroup on LGBT Rights and the European Parliament Intergroup on Western Sahara.

On 8 March 2022 Yenbou announced that she would be joining the Renew Europe group in the European Parliament after having declared her support to Emmanuel Macron in the run-up of the 2022 French presidential election.

References

1971 births
Living people
MEPs for France 2019–2024
21st-century women MEPs for France
People from Aubervilliers
Politicians from Île-de-France